Froggattisca pulchella is a species of antlion (or Myrmeleontidae), endemic to New South Wales and Queensland. 

The species was first described in 1915 by Peter Esben-Petersen.

Description 
Esben-Petersen describes the species from an adult female specimen as:

References

Myrmeleontidae
Insects described in 1915
Fauna of New South Wales
Fauna of Queensland